Ritini is a village and a community of the Katerini municipality. Before the 2011 local government reform, it was part of the municipality of Pierioi, of which it was the seat. The 2011 census recorded 1,138 inhabitants in the village.

References

Populated places in Pieria (regional unit)